The Rachael Ray Show is an American television talk show hosted by Rachael Ray that debuted in syndication in the United States and Canada on September 18, 2006 and also airs in other countries. It is taped at Chelsea Television Studios in New York City. In March 2023, it was confirmed that the 17th season would be its last.

Format

The concept behind this program showcases Ray's culinary skills. She brings various celebrities on screen to discuss their accomplishments in the entertainment, sports, and media industries. Ray asks for tips and strategies for staying healthy and safe from various health and lifestyle experts, she includes make-over segments, and features musical performances, all of which are features along the same lines of The Oprah Winfrey Show. She does, however, keep cooking in the forefront by including at least one cooking segment at the end of each episode, and sometimes inviting her celebrity guests to join her in the kitchen. According to Ray, "People know me for my love of food, but I have so much more I want to share." The set has the audience seated on a large turntable that rotates so that the audience can always see the "action" on the circular stage that surrounds them. At the end of each show, with the exception of a few more guests after Ray's cooking segments, Ray's tagline is, "We'll see you when we see you."

On March 9, 2007, Entertainment Tonight revealed that the show's theme music was written and recorded by Ray's husband, John Cusimano. The original theme song to the show was performed by R&B, Soul and Jazz group The Neville Brothers. Their song had the same rhythm and melody as their classic hit "Yellow Moon", but with different lyrics. Aaron Neville sang the song. Starting with the fifth season, the original theme was retired. With the start of the seventh season, the show was updated and shot in a new studio. The new studio is in New York City in the Chelsea neighborhood, and shared the building with The Wendy Williams Show until 2022 and  Sherri since 2022. Audience members can be seen lined up outside the studios usually on Tuesdays, Wednesdays and Thursdays. Episodes are shot at 11:30 a.m. and 3:30 p.m. each day.

Ratings

During its first season, the show averaged about 2.6 million views daily, making it one of the highest viewed daytime shows. Not long after it debuted, it was revealed that Rachael Ray was renewed through 2010, adding two years to the already two years it had received. In June 2009, Rachael Ray was renewed for two more years, till 2012, making 6 seasons. Rachael Ray was the only one of the four syndicated daytime talk shows that premiered for the 2006–07 season to be renewed. By the show's third season in 2008, ratings had dropped to a 1.8. However ratings leveled off in 2010 with 1.5 and roughly 2 million viewers for the fifth season. At the start of its sixth season in 2011, the show's ratings rose to 1.7. In January 2012, CBS Television Distribution announced a two-year renewal for the show, taking it through the 2013–14 season. Rachael Ray was later renewed for another two years in October 2013, bringing the series through the 2015–16 season and its tenth season. In March 2018, CBS Television Distribution renewed the show for a 13th season. In January 2019, the show was renewed for a 14th season. On March 30, 2020, Rachael Ray began hosting the show from home with her husband, John Cusimano, amid the COVID-19 pandemic. The show was renewed for a 15th season to premiere on September 14, 2020, with Ray still hosting from home. On July 2, 2021, Rachael Ray returned to the studio with her husband, John Cusimano. On October 13, 2021, Rachael Ray returned to the studio with a whole new set. The 16th season marked the return of the live studio audience.

Awards

References

External links
 
 

2006 American television series debuts
2023 American television series endings
2000s American television talk shows
2010s American television talk shows
2020s American television talk shows
Daytime Emmy Award for Outstanding Talk Show winners
First-run syndicated television programs in the United States
Television series by CBS Studios
English-language television shows
Television series by Harpo Productions
American television spin-offs
Television series by King World Productions
Warner Bros. Discovery
Television shows filmed in New York City